Toucan 'Tecs: The Adventures of Zippi & Zac is a British children's television programme about two private detectives, a pair of anthropomorphic toucans named Zippi and Zac (voiced by Philip Whitchurch and Tony Robinson respectively), who, although based in the jungle, flew around the world solving crimes on their flying devices. Their main enemies were group of ducks, called "The Mad Ducks", led by Red Leader.

Produced and Animated by Cartwn Cymru, S4C and Yorkshire Television, the show debuted on CITV in 1990 and consists of 26 ten-minute episodes.

Characters
Zippi - The brains of the Toucan 'Tecs, who comes up with plans. Wherever he goes around the world, he always wears a matching hat corresponding to the country. He is voiced by Philip Whitchurch.
Zac - Zippi's partner of the Toucan 'Tecs, who carries out Zippi's plans. He wears blue glasses. He is voiced by Tony Robinson.
Samson - A snail who provides the equipment that toucans will need to carry out their cases. He wears a fuchsia and aqua polka dot bow tie. He has a Scottish accent and is the Toucan 'Tecs agent. He is voiced by Philip Whitchurch.
Fifi - A fat duck who provides transport for the toucans. She is voiced by Kate Lee in a German accent.
The Mad Ducks - The main antagonists who are always up to no good, having fun and playing at others inconvenience and expense. They wear pilot helmets in different colours and goggles. They are voiced by Tony Robinson, Philip Whitchurch and Kate Lee.
The Red Leader - The boss of the Mad Ducks. She always gives the word and wears a brown jacket, a pale pink scarf, a red pilot helmet and goggles. She is voiced by Kate Lee.

Episodes

Credits
Developed from Zippi and Zac a series of books by Heinemann Young Books
Original story by: Peter Lawson and Elizabeth Laird
Series Consultants: Cartwn Cymru
Script: Roger Stennett, John Gatehouse
Voices: Kate Lee, Tony Robinson, Philip Whitchurch
Storyboard and Layout: Wayne Thomas, Nik Lever
Backgrounds: Jocelyn Smith, Karen Pereira
Animation: Paul Bannister, Steve Hayne, Roger Philips, Lloyd Sutton, Graham Griffiths, Chris Webster, Nigel Davies, Andrew Janes, Phil Parker, Theresa Whatley, Andy Wilson, Malcom McGookin, Darren Holt, Denise Heywood, Martin Edwards
Assistant Animation: Helen Smith, Johnathan Tordoff, Helen Michael, Paul Greenall, Michael Harrison, David Taylor, Craig Whittle, Jonathan Barry
For the Ink 'n' Paint Co: Elizabeth Butler, Nic Howell, Andrew Peters, Lisa Ann Pike, Marie Sheard, Inez Stoodley, Jenny Thomissen, Rosemary Thorburn, Pauline Webster, Wendy Williams
Xerox and Tracing: Mark Grindley, Joanna Alvey, Ruth Jacobs, Dona Walsh
Painting: Colour Crew
Line Tester: Duncan Harris
Camera: Cardiff Cartoon Camera Company, Mark Sutton, Steve Charkewycz, Tim Francis
Sound: Eco Ltd, Ray Buckley, APS, Ian Gillespie, Silk Sound
Materials: Film Sales, Cromacolour
Editor: Robert Francis
Off-Line Editor: Andrew Brearley
On-Line Editing: Editz
Music: Ernie Wood
Production Co-ordinators: Ceri Griffin, Melvin Howcroft
Directors: Gary Hurst, Nik Lever
Producers: Naomi Jones, Ian Steel
Executive Producers: Christopher Grace, John Marsen
a Cartwn Cymru production for Yorkshire Television in association with S4C
A Catslyst Pictures Ltd Production in association with Cartoon for Yorkshire Television
© Yorkshire Television Ltd MCMXC/MCMXCII

Music

Finnish
Songs in the Finnish dub were sung by the actors of YLE Import re-using the De Angelis's music but with new Finnish lyrics. In the Finnish dub some scenes are cut, which includes musical numbers in some episodes.

Lukijat

 Finnish: (Tukaanit Suomeksi)

External links

Toonhound

1990 British television series debuts
1993 British television series endings
ITV children's television shows
British detective television series
Television series about birds
Television series about ducks
S4C original programming
Television series by ITV Studios
Television series by Yorkshire Television
English-language television shows